Robert R. Gerhart, Jr. (December 21, 1920 – August 23, 2021) was an American politician who served as a Democratic member of the Pennsylvania State Senate for the 11th district from 1969 to 1972.  He also served as a member of the Pennsylvania House of Representatives for the 126th district from 1967 to 1968.

Early life and education
He was born in Robesonia, Pennsylvania to Robert R. and Mae R. Moyer Gerhart. He attended Robesonia High School and graduated from Albright College in 1941. He served in the U.S. Army during World War II from 1945 to 1946.

Business career
He worked as a news reporter for the Reading Times from 1938 to 1948. He was the owner of the Diamond Beach Resort in Wildwood, New Jersey from 1966 to 1986. He was the owner of a public relations company named Roberts & Company. He published the New Era union journal in Reading, Pennsylvania and was one of the early pioneers in the Pennsylvania cable TV business as the founder of Suburban TV Cable Company.

Political career
Gerhart worked as a campaign manager for U.S. Congressman George M. Rhodes. He was a member of the Robesonia Borough Council from 1946 to 1956.  He served as a member of the Pennsylvania House of Representatives for the 126th district from 1967 to 1968 and the Pennsylvania Senate for the 11th district from 1969 to 1972.

Personal life
Gerhart and his wife Lillian Gerhart donated $1.5 million to Albright College to establish the Bob and Lillian Gerhart Chair in Communications.

He died in Tucson, Arizona, in August 2021 at the age of 100.

References

1920 births
2021 deaths
20th-century American politicians
Albright College alumni
United States Army personnel of World War II
Journalists from Pennsylvania
Democratic Party members of the Pennsylvania House of Representatives
Pennsylvania city council members
Democratic Party Pennsylvania state senators
People from Berks County, Pennsylvania
American centenarians
Men centenarians